The 2007 Big Sky Conference men's basketball tournament was a tournament that decided the Big Sky Conference's automatic bid to the 2007 NCAA men's basketball tournament.

References

Big Sky Media Guide

Big Sky Conference men's basketball tournament
Tournament
Big Sky Conference men's basketball tournament
Big Sky Conference men's basketball tournament
Basketball competitions in Ogden, Utah
College sports tournaments in Utah